As Night Falls (released in Germany as Die Nacht der Zombies) is a 2013 horror film directed by Joe Davison. It was created in 2010 but was not released until November 12, 2013, when it was sent straight to DVD. It stars Debbie Rochon as a mother who returns from the dead to "discipline" anyone she thinks is naughty.

Premise
Sisters Holly (Lily Cardone) and Elizabeth (Deneen Melody) are living in a house of murder. Fifty years ago, a young girl named Amelia (Grace Chapman) was brutally murdered by unseen methods. Now her parents have returned from their grave to enact their own strict discipline on anyone they believe is misbehaving and staying up past nightfall.

Cast
Debbie Rochon as The Mother - Nelly Trine
Julie Anne as Olivia
Deneen Melody as Elizabeth
Raine Brown as Stephanie
Rod Grant as Principal
Jeremy King as Tim
Brian Kahrs as Zombie / Jimmy the Cop
Lily Cardone as Holly
Ken Anthony II	as Steve
Joe Davison as Charlie
Dwight Cenac as Otto
Grace Chapman as Amelia
Stacci Sastre Reed as Erica
André Reissig as Pennywise
Tyler Cross as Dude

Reception
Critical reception for As Night Falls was negative and Bloody Disgusting panned the film's acting as particularly bad. Ain't It Cool News and HorrorNews.net also gave negative reviews, with HorrorNews.net commenting that "it ain’t the worst thing I’ve seen this month but it’s pretty disappointing all the same." DVD Verdict gave a mixed review, saying that while the film wasn't "guilty" it was also generic and that "Those looking for new scares or novel pleasures should steer clear."

References

External links
 

2013 films
2013 horror films
Camcorder films
2010s English-language films